"A Modern Way of Letting Go" is a song by Scottish rock band Idlewild, from their 2002 album The Remote Part. It was the fourth and last single taken from the album and charted at #28 in the UK Singles Chart (see 2003 in British music).

The song is featured in the 2005 video game Midnight Club 3: DUB Edition by Rockstar.

Track listings

In the UK
Limited edition CD
"A Modern Way of Letting Go"
"In Remote Part/Scottish Fiction (Live)"
"A Modern Way of Letting Go (Live)"
 DVD
"A Modern Way of Letting Go" Music video
"In Remote Part: New York footage 2002" Video
"(I Am) What I Am Not (Live)" Audio track
Photo gallery
 7"
"A Modern Way of Letting Go"
"A Modern Way of Letting Go (Live)"

References 

2003 singles
2002 songs
Idlewild (band) songs
Song recordings produced by Dave Eringa
Parlophone singles
Songs written by Bob Fairfoull
Songs written by Colin Newton
Songs written by Rod Jones (musician)
Songs written by Roddy Woomble